Hymenocarpos circinnatus is a species of annual herb in the family Fabaceae. They have a self-supporting growth form and compound, broad leaves. Flowers are visited by Mason bees. Individuals can grow to 30 cm tall.

Sources

References 

Loteae
Flora of Malta